Maxine Lapiduss is an American comedian-singer, television comedy writer, director, producer, entrepreneur, and branding strategist.
She is a graduate of Taylor Allderdice High School and the Carnegie Mellon University School of Drama, both in Pittsburgh, Pennsylvania where she was born and raised.

Lapiduss wrote and produced many notable comedy series including Dharma & Greg, Ellen, Roseanne, Home Improvement and more.

Storyverse Studios
Lapiduss is the co-founder and CEO of Storyverse Studios, an entertainment company founded in Los Angeles in 2014.  Storyverse develops and produces story-driven properties within a multi-platform universe of entertainment.  Their first property, Find Me I'm Yours, launched on November 3, 2014, and begins as a media rich ebook, written and designed by writer/artist/web innovator, Hillary Carlip, and published by Rosetta Books. The romantic comedy novel is filled with hand-written lists, Instagram-style photos, videos and links to its 33 original websites, and five web series all created as part of this Click Lit experience.

Television writer/producer/director

Lapiduss wrote and produced the last season of Ellen (three Emmy nominations), Roseanne, (Emmy nomination as Best Comedy Series and a Golden Globe award), Home Improvement (People's Choice Awards for Best Comedy Series), Dharma & Greg, and Situation: Comedy, a Bravo reality series Lapiduss starred in and produced with Sean Hayes (Will and Grace) about how to make a sitcom. She has directed Disney Channel's acclaimed show, Jessie.

Lapiduss spent four months managing relationships and production on 40 episodes of the Russian adaptation of The King of Queens in Moscow. She also acted as Studio Executive and show runner for the pilots and post production of Sony International TV's adaptations of The Cosby Show and Rules of Engagement for CTC Media.

Lapiduss also co-founded non-profit Steeltown Entertainment Project, a teaching organization and production company whose mission is to bring film and TV production jobs back to Pittsburgh.

Creative strategist

For more than a decade, Lapiduss has been working with artists, writers, performers, and filmmakers to expand their brands through her consulting company, Lapiduss Creative.

Lapiduss also pioneered one of the earliest online digital networks, Voxxy (1999-2001). As Co-President, Co-Founder, and Executive Creative Strategist, Lapiduss raised two rounds of financing, contracted A-list talent and notables for Voxxy involvement including Jennifer Aniston, Melissa Etheridge, Billie Jean King, Kathy Najimy, and Shirley Manson, among others. Lapiduss also recruited Hollywood show runners and producers to create content, and developed branded "advertainment" for entertainment companies, record labels, and businesses including Motorola and Hard Candy. Voxxy won the 2000 Bandie Broadband Award for innovation in the category "Newest New Thing."

Performer

Lapiduss has written, starred in, and produced several one-woman variety shows including "Mackie's Back in Town", and has been honored with a nomination for Best Cabaret Artist (Female) 2011, by Broadway World Los Angeles.

Her video "Scared About Life Without Oprah" included a cameo by Glee's Jane Lynch and was featured in The Huffington Post, USA Today, and TV Guide.

Awards and nominations

2011 Broadway World Award Nomination  -- Best Cabaret Artist (Female) Los Angeles, "Mackie's Back in Town"
Golden Globe Award -- Roseanne, Producer
Emmy Nomination -- Roseanne, Best Comedy Series, Writer/Producer
Emmy Nomination -- Home Improvement, Best Comedy Series, Writer/Co-Executive Producer
Emmy Nomination -- Ellen, Best Comedy Series and Best Writing, Writer/Consultant
Steeltown Presents Best Local Special , Writer/Host and Executive Producer
People's Choice Award  --Home Improvement , Co-Executive Producer
Ace Award  -- Free To Laugh, Writer/Executive Producer
Bandie Broadband Award  -- Voxxy.com, Newest New Thing
Ovation Award (multiple nominations) -- Situation Tragedy, Writer/Performer/Producer 
Dramalogue/Backstage Magazine Awards  -- Outstanding Achievement in Theater,  14 awards for Situation Tragedy, Writer/Performer/Producer

References

External links
 
 

Television producers from Pennsylvania
American women television producers
American television writers
Writers from Pittsburgh
American women comedians
Carnegie Mellon University College of Fine Arts alumni
Lesbian comedians
American lesbian writers
American LGBT businesspeople
Living people
American women television writers
Place of birth missing (living people)
Year of birth missing (living people)
American women chief executives
Women chief executives
American women company founders
American company founders
Taylor Allderdice High School alumni
20th-century American screenwriters
20th-century American women writers
20th-century American comedians
21st-century American comedians
Comedians from Pennsylvania